The 12th National Television Awards ceremony was held at the Royal Albert Hall on 1 November 2006 and was hosted by Sir Trevor McDonald.

Awards

References

National Television Awards
National Television Awards
National Television Awards
2006 in London
National Television Awards
National Television Awards